Brandon Halverson (born March 29, 1996)  is an American professional ice hockey goaltender who is currently an unrestricted free agent. He was selected by the New York Rangers, 59th overall, in the 2014 NHL Entry Draft.

Playing career
Halverson played major junior hockey with the Sault Ste. Marie Greyhounds of the Ontario Hockey League (OHL). On July 2, 2015, the New York Rangers signed Halverson to an entry-level contract.

During the 2017–18 season, on February 17, 2018, Halverson made his NHL debut with the Rangers, stopping 5 shots and allowing 1 goal, in a 6–3 loss to the Ottawa Senators.

Following the conclusion of his entry-level contract, Halverson was not tendered a qualifying offer, releasing him as a free agent from the Rangers. Leading into the 2019–20 season, Halverson continued in the ECHL, securing a contract with the Norfolk Admirals on October 4, 2019. Halverson made 19 appearances with the Admirals, collecting 5 wins while also loaned to the AHL with the Providence Bruins and Tucson Roadrunners, appearing in two games with the latter.

As a free agent, Halverson opted to continue in the ECHL, securing a contract with the Wheeling Nailers on November 27, 2020. Limited to just four games with the Nailers in the 2020–21 season, Halverson left the club as a free agent and agreed to join fellow ECHL outfit, the Florida Everblades, on September 4, 2021. He was later released from his contract with the Everblades prior to the 2021–22 season.

Career statistics

Regular season and playoffs

International

See also
List of players who played only one game in the NHL

References

External links
 

1996 births
Living people
American men's ice hockey goaltenders
Greenville Swamp Rabbits players
Hartford Wolf Pack players
Ice hockey players from Michigan
Maine Mariners (ECHL) players
New York Rangers draft picks
New York Rangers players
Norfolk Admirals (ECHL) players
People from Traverse City, Michigan
Sportspeople from Traverse City, Michigan
Sault Ste. Marie Greyhounds players
Tucson Roadrunners players
Wheeling Nailers players